In geometry, the small dodecicosacron (or small dipteral trisicosahedron) is the dual of the small dodecicosahedron (U50). It is visually identical to the Small ditrigonal dodecacronic hexecontahedron. It has 60 intersecting bow-tie-shaped faces.

Proportions
The dihedral angle equals . The ratio between the lengths of the long edges and the short ones equals , which is the golden ratio. Part of each face lies inside the solid, hence is invisible in solid models.

References

External links

 Uniform polyhedra and duals
Dual uniform polyhedra